Anthony Howe (born 1954, Salt Lake City, Utah) is an American kinetic sculptor who creates wind-driven sculptures resembling pulsing, alien creatures and vortices. He makes use of computer-aided design, shaping the metal components with a plasma cutter, and completing his work by use of traditional metalworking techniques.

Howe notably designed a cauldron and accompanying kinetic sculpture for the 2016 Summer Olympics in Rio, Brazil.

Education and work
Howe attended The Taft School between 1969 and 1973, and for the next 6 years was enrolled at Cornell University and Skowhegan School of Painting and Sculpture. In 1979 he built a house on a remote mountaintop in New Hampshire. Here he painted beautiful landscapes for a wonderful five years, and displayed his work at 'Gallery on the Green' in Lexington, Massachusetts. His paintings may be found in the collections of Teradyne, Harvard University, the William Small collection and other public and private collections.

In 1985 Howe moved to New York City and turned from painting to kinetic sculpting. Four years later his first work was hung from old elevator cables stretched between buildings. In 1993 he joined the Kim Foster Gallery in New York, and the following year moved to Orcas Island in Washington, where he once again built a house and opened his own gallery.

He claims one of his methods of testing the sculptures is by fixing them to top of his van and then driving down the local airstrip.

In August 2015, Howe was offered the role of designing a cauldron for the 2016 Summer Olympics in Rio de Janeiro, Brazil. The games' organizers had decided not to have a larger cauldron and flame as part of an effort to be environmentally conscious, resulting in the construction of a small cauldron with a larger kinetic sculpture to accompany it; the sculpture, which consists of ring of rotating bars, a 40 ft (12.2 m) in diameter, with reflective plates and spheres, was meant to enhance the appearance of the smaller flame, providing an effect inspired by the "pulsing energy and reflection of light" of the sun.  The sculpture was designed at his studio on Orcas Island, with final construction occurring in Montreal before being shipped to Rio.

References

External links
 Official website.
Video by Elizabeth Rudge
 Compilation Videos of Howe's Works -- -- -- Short Version and Long Version
'Anthony Howe's Otherworldly Kinetic Sculptures'
'Orcas Island, WA: Anthony Howe's kinetic sculptures'
The Creators Project
Video of 'Octo' sculpture
'Big Wind Whelp'
'Study for potential kinetic sculpture'

Kinetic sculptors
1954 births
Living people
Artists from Salt Lake City
Taft School alumni
Cornell University alumni
Sculptors from Utah
Skowhegan School of Painting and Sculpture alumni